Washington–Kosciusko Elementary School (W-K for short) is an elementary school in Winona, Minnesota, United States.  Its building was constructed in 1934, the fourth of five new facilities built by Winona Public Schools in the early 20th century to implement progressive educational reforms.  It was listed on the National Register of Historic Places in 2012 for its significance in the theme of education.  It was nominated for representing the 20th-century development of Winona Public Schools and for being a project of the Public Works Administration, the largest federal relief program of the New Deal.

See also
 National Register of Historic Places listings in Winona County, Minnesota

References

External links

 Washington-Kosciusko Elementary School

1934 establishments in Minnesota
Buildings and structures in Winona, Minnesota
Moderne architecture in Minnesota
National Register of Historic Places in Winona County, Minnesota
Public elementary schools in Minnesota
Public Works Administration in Minnesota
School buildings completed in 1934
School buildings on the National Register of Historic Places in Minnesota
Schools in Winona County, Minnesota